Odessia is a genus of cnidarians belonging to the family Moerisiidae.

The species of this genus are found in Europe.

Species:

Odessia maeotica 
Odessia microtentaculata

References

 
Hydrozoan genera